Blossi/810551 is a 1997 Icelandic drama film directed by Júlíus Kemp. The film was selected as the Icelandic entry for the Best Foreign Language Film at the 70th Academy Awards, but was not accepted as a nominee.

Cast
 Páll Banine as Robbi
 Þóra Dungal as Stella
 Finnur Jóhannsson as Ulfur
 Jón Gnarr as Crazy Radio Caller

See also
 List of submissions to the 70th Academy Awards for Best Foreign Language Film
 List of Icelandic submissions for the Academy Award for Best Foreign Language Film

References

External links
 

1997 films
1997 drama films
Icelandic drama films
1990s Icelandic-language films